Geraldine Hunt ( Milligan; February 10, 1945 – October 27, 2022) was an American R&B singer best known for the 1980 No. 1 Hot Dance Music/Club Play hit "Can't Fake the Feeling".

Early life
Hunt's parents are Rosie Lee Vickers and Frank Milligan. Her father was a one-man band, and her grandmother, Louella Reed, was a singer on the Chitlin Circuit. In 1947 her family relocated to Chicago. While growing up on Chicago's south side Hunt discovered her musical talent. Living in that part of Chicago was not easy; recalls Geraldine. "On the weekends, we had to sleep on the floor, gangs were shooting through the house; I had been beaten up at gunpoint once, It was rough. We were living below middle class."

Despite the bleak living conditions of her childhood, there were bright spots also. A notable time in her life was her years at Hyde Park High School. Her classmate and best friend at school was the late American soul singer-songwriter Minnie Riperton. Besides Hunt and Riperton, the school also produced a girl group called Coffee who covered Ruby Andrews' "Casanova" in 1980.

Career
Hunt began her recording career as a teenager with several singles released from 1962: she had her first glimmer of success in 1970 when "You & I" a duet with Charlie Hodges reached No. 45 on the R&B chart in Billboard and in 1972 Hunt's remake of "Baby I Need Your Loving" reached No. 47 R&B.

In 1975 Hunt relocated to Montreal, Quebec where she recorded her first album in 1978, the disco-oriented Sweet Honesty. In 1980 Hunt's second album No Way yielded the track "Can't Fake the Feeling" which reached No. 1 on the club chart in Billboard where it spent a total of seven weeks: with top 40 radio then being disco-resistant "Can't Fake the Feeling" had little mainstream success reaching No. 58 R&B. However the track did afford Hunt a hit in France at No. 10 and charted in the UK at No. 44.

In 1982 she helped write and produce some of the music for Chéri.

In 2014, Hunt was honored for her contributions to composing and publishing music at the 25th Anniversary SOCAN Montreal Gala Celebrates Music Creators and Publishers.

Personal life
Hunt was the mother of three children; Rosalind Hunt of the musical group Chéri, singer Freddie James and professor/writer Jeanne Croteau. She had seven grandchildren.

Discography

Studio albums
 Sweet Honesty (1978)
 No Way (1980)

Compilation albums
 Can't Fake the Feeling (1993)

Singles

See also
 List of number-one dance hits (United States)
 List of artists who reached number one on the US Dance chart

References

External links
 
 

1945 births
2022 deaths
American dance musicians
American rhythm and blues singers
American expatriate musicians in Canada
20th-century Black Canadian women singers
Canadian dance musicians
Canadian rhythm and blues singers
Hyde Park Academy High School alumni
Musicians from St. Louis
Musicians from Montreal
20th-century African-American women singers